Ananth Kumar (1959–2018) was an Indian politician.

Ananth Kumar may also refer to:

 Anant Kumar (author) (born September 28, 1969), German author, translator and literary critic of Indian descent
 Ananth Kumar Hegde (born 1968), Indian politician

See also
 Anand Kumar (disambiguation)